Spatalla racemosa, the lax-stalked spoon, is a flower-bearing shrub that belongs to the genus Spatalla and forms part of the fynbos. The plant is native to the Western Cape where it is found in the Kogelberg, Groenland mountains, Babilonstoringberge, Kleinrivier Mountains as well as at Villiersdorp.

The shrub grows only 50 cm tall and flowers from September to March. The plant dies after a fire but the seeds survive. The plant is bisexual and pollination takes place through the action of insects. Two months after the plant has flowered, the ripe seeds fall to the ground where they are spread by ants. The plant grows in a variety of habitats: rocky slopes and level, sandstone soil at altitudes of 150-620 m.

References  

racemosa